Suringer Singh may refer to:

People
Surinder Singh (Ashok Chakra) (died 2002), Indian soldier, recipient of the Ashok Chakra
Surinder Singh (commando), Indian soldier who turned politician
Surinder Singh (general), general in the India Army
Surinder Singh Bajwa (c. 1955 – 2007), politician
Surinder Singh Kairon (1927–2009), politician
Surinder Singh of Singh Bandhu, musical duo
Surinder Singh Sodhi, Indian hockey player
Surinder Singh Nijjar (1949–2021), judge of the Supreme Court of India
Surinder Singh (footballer) (born 1973), former Indian football player
Surinder Singh (cricketer), Filipino cricketer

Legal
Surinder Singh route, a method for British citizens to secure U.K. immigration rights for their non-European spouses
Surinder Singh Kanda v. The Government of the Federation of Malaya, court case